Roman Alekseyevich Yevgenyev (born 23 February 1999) is a Russian football player who plays as a center back for Krylia Sovetov Samara. A former Russian youth international, Yevgenyev was included in the senior squad by Russia at UEFA Euro 2020.

Club career
He made his debut in the Russian Professional Football League for FC Dynamo-2 Moscow on 2 April 2017 in a game against FC Dynamo Saint Petersburg.

He made his Russian Premier League debut for FC Dynamo Moscow on 6 October 2018 in a game against FC Krylia Sovetov Samara.

On 24 June 2019, he signed a new 3-year contract with Dynamo.

On 8 November 2020, he started the game against FC Lokomotiv Moscow as Dynamo's captain for the first time (as regular captain Anton Shunin missed the game) and scored his first Dynamo goal in the 3rd minute of the game as Dynamo won 5–1. Yevgenyev formed a partnership in central defense with Ivan Ordets, and made a career-high 27 appearances during the season. His performances earned him an inclusion in Russia's provisional Euro 2020 squad.

Entering the 2021–22 season, Dynamo signed Fabián Balbuena from West Ham, and this pushed Yevgenyev out of the starting line-up. His first start of the season came on 12 September, after Balbuena had played international football with Paraguay just three days prior. He did not appear again until 16 October, when Balbuena once again was coming back from the national team duty. By the winter break of the season, he appeared in 8 out of 18 league games, with only two starts. He started (and scored one goal) in two Russian Cup games Dynamo played up to that point. Following the beginning of the 2022 Russian invasion of Ukraine, Ukrainian defender Ivan Ordets stopped appearing for Dynamo, and Yevgenyev returned to the starting lineup for the remainder of the season to replace him.

Yevgenyev left Dynamo as his contract expired in June 2022.

On 15 July 2022, Yevgenyev signed a two-year contract with Krylia Sovetov Samara. On 27 January 2023, he extended his contract with Krylia Sovetov until the end of the 2025–26 season.

International career
In November 2020, he was called up to the Russia national football team for the first time for the games against Moldova, Turkey and Serbia. 
He made his debut on 18 November 2020 in a Nations League game against Serbia.

On 11 May 2021, he was included in the preliminary extended 30-man squad for UEFA Euro 2020. He was not included in the final squad. On 11 June 2021, he was added to the squad, replacing Andrei Mostovoy who tested positive for COVID-19. He did not appear in any games as Russia was eliminated at group stage.

Career statistics

Club

References

External links
 
 

1999 births
Sportspeople from Primorsky Krai
Living people
Russian footballers
Russia youth international footballers
Russia under-21 international footballers
Russia international footballers
Association football defenders
FC Dynamo Moscow players
PFC Krylia Sovetov Samara players
Russian Premier League players
Russian Second League players
UEFA Euro 2020 players